Pierce Mahony (19 December 1792 – 18 February 1853) was an Irish Repeal politician and Member of Parliament (MP) in the House of Commons of the United Kingdom of Great Britain and Ireland.

He was a close associate of Daniel O'Connell, and was elected for the Kinsale constituency at 1837 general election but unseated on petition in April 1838.

References

External links

1792 births
1853 deaths
Members of the Parliament of the United Kingdom for County Cork constituencies (1801–1922)
UK MPs 1837–1841
People from County Cork
Irish Repeal Association MPs